Mesteacăn ("birch") may refer to several places in Romania:

 Mesteacăn, a village in Corni Commune, Botoșani County
 Mesteacăn, a village in Cornereva Commune, Caraș-Severin County
 Mesteacăn, a village in Văleni-Dâmbovița Commune, Dâmbovița County
 Mesteacăn, a village in  the city of Brad, Hunedoara County
 Mesteacăn, a village in Răchitova Commune, Hunedoara County
 Mesteacăn, a village in Valea Chioarului Commune, Maramureș County
 Mesteacăn, a village in Icușești Commune, Neamț County
 Mesteacăn, a village in Halmeu Commune, Satu Mare County
 Mesteacăn, a tributary of the river Fiad in Bistrița-Năsăud County

See also 
 Mesteacănu (disambiguation)